Derrida and Lacan: Another Writing is a 2008 book by British philosopher Michael Lewis in which the author "argues that Jacques Derrida's philosophical understanding of language should be supplemented by Jacques Lacan's psychoanalytic approach to the symbolic order."

References

External links 
 Derrida and Lacan: Another Writing

2008 non-fiction books
Continental philosophy literature
Edinburgh University Press books
Works about Jacques Derrida
Books about linguists
Jacques Lacan